Tilkut also known as tilkutam, gajak, tilpatti, is a sweet made in the Indian states of Bihar, Jharkhand.

Tilkut is especially made and eaten during Sakraat or "Makar sankranti" festival. It is made of pounded 'til' or sesame seeds (Sesamum indicum) and jaggery or sugar. The best tilkut is said to be from Gaya and is native to Magadh region only. Reference to this dry sweet is found in the Buddhist literature as palala.

Normally, three types of tilkuts are available — the refined sugar tilkut is white in colour, the shakkar tilkut is made of unrefined sugar and is light brown in colour and the gur tilkut is made of jaggery and is dark brown in colour. Each of these varieties has its own flavour.  The circular shaped savoury is called tilkut and the smaller nut-sized ones are called tillouri.

Winter is the period when sugarcane is harvested. It is also when large quantities of tilkut are made in many towns and even villages. However, as the demand persists throughout the year, smaller quantities are made round the year.

Regions 
Tilkut is Seasonal Dessert used in the Indian States of Bihar, Jharkhand, West Bengal. During the time of December and January tilkut is sold widely in these regions and it is loved dessert for all ages. it is also related to grah and nakshatra dos.

See also
 Bihari cuisine
 Cuisine of Jharkhand
 List of sesame seed dishes

Indian desserts
Bihari cuisine
Sesame dishes

References